Shmemis also ash-Shmemis, ash-Shmamis) is a castle located 3 km north west of Salamiyah and 30 km south east from Hama.

History

The castle (Qalat Shmamis) was first built, on top of an extinct volcano, in the 1st century BC by Sampsiceramus I, the first Priest King of the Royal family of Emesa. Most of the original structure was subsequently destroyed by an earthquake. It was later destroyed by the Persian king Khosrau II in AD 613. It was rebuilt in AD 1229 by Assad ud-Din Shirkoh, an Ayyubid governor of Homs. The castle was rebuilt by the Ayyubid Cherkouh. The date of this reconstruction was set by Abu Fida in 626 e (1228), while Muhammad Kurd Ali in his book "al-Sham Plans" fixed the 627th (1229). However, the Mongols destroyed it in 1260 and then by the Tatars in 1401. It was rebuilt after the expulsion of the Mongols and Tatars from Syria. The castle today is in ruins with only walls partially preserved.

This castle was built on a basaltic layer covering a conical top of the mountain. This summit is surrounded by a moat 15 m depth, and provides a very deep well to meet the water needs for the castle, and another well for supplies. The walls of the latter well were covered with a layer of lime and sludge. The castle housed the royal palace, as well as foundations for housing soldiers. The importance of this castle is due to its location which allows to observe a circular area of more than 50 km in diameter.

External links

  الموقع الرسمي لمحافظة حماة

Castles in Syria
Emesene dynasty
Roman Syria
Buildings and structures in Hama Governorate